Psych is an American detective comedy-drama television series created by Steve Franks for USA Network. The series stars James Roday Rodriguez as Shawn Spencer, a young crime consultant for the Santa Barbara Police Department whose "heightened observational skills" and impressive eidetic memory allow him to convince people that he solves cases with psychic abilities. The program also stars Dulé Hill as Shawn's intelligent best friend and reluctant partner Burton "Gus" Guster, as well as Corbin Bernsen as Shawn's father, Henry, a former detective with the Santa Barbara Police Department.

Psych premiered on July 7, 2006, following the fifth-season premiere of Monk, and continued to be paired with the series until Monk's conclusion on December 4, 2009. During the second season, an animated segment titled "The Big Adventures of Little Shawn and Gus" was added to the series. Psych was the highest-rated US basic cable television premiere of 2006. USA Network renewed the series for an eighth season on December 19, 2012, to include eight episodes, and ordered two more episodes on June 25, 2013, bringing the episode order to ten. On February 5, 2014, USA Network confirmed that the eighth season of Psych would be its last, with the series finale airing on March 26, 2014.

The show has developed a cult following, especially in the years since going off air, with fans of the show being called "PsychOs". Psych: The Movie, a two-hour TV film, aired on USA Network on December 7, 2017. Franks' hope is to make five more Psych movies, following Psych: The Movie. On February 14, 2019, it was announced Psych: The Movie 2 was greenlit and all the main cast would return for the TV film, which was set to premiere in late 2019, but the premiere thereof was subsequently delayed to 2020, with the film renamed Psych 2: Lassie Come Home. The film was released on NBCUniversal's streaming service, Peacock, July 15, 2020, the day the service officially launched. On May 13, 2021, Peacock announced a third film, Psych 3: This Is Gus, which premiered on November 18, 2021.

Overview
Most episodes begin with a cold open in the form of a flashback to Shawn and Gus's childhoods. The flashbacks usually involve Shawn and Gus being taught a lesson by a young Henry Spencer (Shawn's father) (Corbin Bernsen), who wishes that his son would follow in his footsteps and become a law enforcement officer. These lessons often play a role for the climax of the episode. As a child, Shawn was taught by Henry to hone his powers of observation and deduction, often using games and challenges to test him. Each flashback also sets the theme for the episode.

Shawn originally becomes known as a psychic when, after calling in tips on dozens of crimes covered on the news which help the police to close the case, the police become suspicious of his knowledge, theorizing that such knowledge could only come from the "inside" and unwilling to believe that it is merely Shawn having honed his observational skills. To avoid being sent to jail, Shawn uses those skills to convince the police that he is psychic; though the interim police chief warns Shawn that if his "powers" are fake, he will be prosecuted. With no choice but to keep up the act, and having proven himself an effective aid to the police in solving crimes, he establishes a psychic detective agency, Psych, and becomes an outside consultant to the police. Pretending to have psychic powers allows him to engage in strange and comic behavior as he turns real clues into hunches and otherworldly visitations. He enjoys teasing lifelong friend Burton Guster (Gus), a pharmaceutical sales representative, about Gus's eclectic interests as they drive around in a blue Toyota Echo nicknamed "The Blueberry" solving crimes.

Head detective Carlton Lassiter (Timothy Omundson), playfully nicknamed "Lassie" by Shawn and Gus, quietly comes to respect Shawn's crime-solving skills despite doubting his psychic abilities; Lassiter is constantly exasperated by Shawn keeping investigations ongoing and/or infuriated by Shawn's antics. However, junior detective Juliet "Jules" O'Hara (Maggie Lawson) and Chief Vick (Kirsten Nelson) are far less antagonistic – with O'Hara expressing belief in Shawn's abilities while Vick is mum on the subject – and usually willing to give Shawn the leeway he needs to solve cases. Henry and Shawn have a difficult relationship, but despite this, Henry reluctantly helps Shawn on various occasions.

Characters

Main

Shawn Spencer (James Roday) is a freelance consultant with the Santa Barbara Police Department who pretends to be a psychic.
Burton "Gus" Guster (Dulé Hill) is Shawn's best friend and business partner.
Carlton "Lassie" Lassiter (Timothy Omundson) is the head detective for the Santa Barbara Police Department.
Juliet "Jules" O'Hara (Maggie Lawson) is a junior detective for the Santa Barbara Police Department partnered with Lassiter.
Henry Spencer (Corbin Bernsen) is Shawn's uptight and precise father and a former police sergeant.
Karen Vick (Kirsten Nelson) is the SBPD Interim Chief and is later named Chief in "Shawn (and Gus) of the Dead" (main seasons 2–8, recurring season 1).
Lucinda Barry (Anne Dudek) is Lassiter's original partner and love interest in the pilot, she is transferred after Shawn tips off her relationship with Lassiter to the Santa Barbara Police Department (season 1).

Recurring
Young Shawn (seasons 1–5: Liam James; seasons 5–6: Skyler Gisondo) is the younger version of Shawn Spencer.
Young Gus (Carlos McCullers II) is the younger version of Burton "Gus" Guster.
Buzz McNab (Sage Brocklebank) is a naive but lovable cop who often provides Shawn and Gus with clues.
Madeleine Spencer (Cybill Shepherd) is a police psychologist who is Shawn's mother and Henry's ex-wife.
Abigail Lytar (Rachael Leigh Cook) is Shawn's high-school crush.
Winnie Guster (Phylicia Rashad) is Gus' mother.
Bill Guster (season 2: Ernie Hudson; season 3: Keith David) is Gus' father.
Mr. Yang (Ally Sheedy) is a serial killer.
Mary Lightly (Jimmi Simpson) is a department psychologist who is an expert on Mr. Yang.
Woody the Coroner (Kurt Fuller) is a police coroner with whom Shawn shares a mutual respect.
Pierre Despereaux (Cary Elwes) is an extremely elusive Canadian art thief.
Declan Rand (Nestor Carbonell) is a rich criminal profiler.
Marlowe Viccellio (Kristy Swanson) is a woman Lassiter meets and later marries.
Curt Smith (himself) is the singer of the band Tears for Fears.
 Frank O'Hara (William Shatner) is Juliet's estranged father.
Rachael (Parminder Nagra) is Gus' girlfriend.
Lloyd French (Jeffrey Tambor) is Juliet's stepfather.
Harris Trout (Anthony Michael Hall) is a special consultant hired by the mayor to increase efficiency at the SBPD.
Betsy Brannigan (Mira Sorvino) takes over as the new head detective when Lassiter is promoted to chief.
Father Wesley (Ray Wise) is a Catholic priest and friend of Shawn and Gus.

Episodes

Production
The show uses White Rock, British Columbia, Canada for its Santa Barbara, California setting. Psych also incorporates Vancouver and various locations around the Lower Mainland of British Columbia as a backdrop. Santa Barbara is on a mountainous coastline without bays and just has the few Channel Islands miles offshore. Many of the overlooking helicopter shots and set-up shots (in which the exterior of the Santa Barbara Courthouse is shown) are actually filmed in Santa Barbara. The animated segments "The Big Adventures of Little Shawn and Gus" were created by J.J. Sedelmaier Productions, Inc. The music, effects, and sound design for "The Big Adventures of Little Shawn and Gus" were created by Fred Weinberg.

Casting

Anne Dudek's character was written out of the series after the character generated a negative test audience reaction with Lassiter due to their relationship. Maggie Lawson was cast as Juliet O'Hara to serve as a replacement.

Theme song
The theme song for Psych is "I Know You Know" by The Friendly Indians, series creator Steve Franks's band. Some episodes in seasons three through eight use an extended version of "I Know You Know" consisting of the first verse and the chorus, but most episodes use a shortened version consisting of mostly the chorus. In some episodes, the theme song is changed, usually as a tie-in to the theme of the episode to come.

Variations
 The theme was given a Christmas theme for the episode "Gus's Dad May Have Killed an Old Guy". It was used again in "Christmas Joy" (3.09) and "The Polarizing Express".
 The song was sung in Spanish for "Lights, Camera... Homicidio" and "No Country for Two Old Men".
 It was expanded into a Bollywood-themed version sung in Hindi in "Bollywood Homicide" while each of the theme credits was shown first in Hindi, then in English.
 Boyz II Men performed an a cappella version of the theme for "High Top Fade Out". It was used again for the episode "Let's Doo-Wop It Again".
 In  "Romeo and Juliet and Juliet", the main titles are translated in Chinese. However, the actual theme song is not edited.
 Curt Smith of Tears for Fears guest-starred in "Shawn 2.0"  and recorded his own version of the theme. Smith also recorded a song ("This is Christmas") for the episode "The Polarizing Express".
 Julee Cruise, who recorded the theme for Twin Peaks, recorded a slower, extended version of the theme for the Twin Peaks-inspired episode "Dual Spires".
 A superhero-themed version was recorded for "The Amazing Psych-Man & Tap Man, Issue #2". The main titles were also redone in a comic-book style.
 For the episode "Heeeeere's Lassie", the song and main titles were given a theme similar to The Shining.
The Christmas-themed and Hindi versions of the song also include variations on the main titles. The Hindi and Chinese-themed episodes phonetically translated words into Devanagari and Chinese characters, respectively, in their title sequences. The title sequence in the episode "Dual Spires" is an almost shot-for-shot recreation of the title sequence of Twin Peaks. The episode "100 Clues" featured an entirely new main title sequence based on the board game Clue. The actor names and title were shown on game cards similar to those of the cards of suspects in Clue.

Pineapple
In the "pilot", Roday improvised by picking up a pineapple and saying, "Should I slice this up for the road?" Since then, pineapples have appeared in every episode as a running gag, whether just one in the background or the actual mention of it. It is Shawn's go-to housewarming gift. The pineapple is a major marketing point for items related to the show on the USA website. Fan movements, such as fan-made websites, have also been dedicated to finding a pineapple or pineapple-related object in each episode.

"Psych: The Musical"

Before season 8 was aired, the show did a special, 88-minute musical episode. This episode does not fit chronologically in the narrative; there are situations in the episode that would imply that it takes place sometime before the middle of season 7.

Series finale aftershow
Following the series finale on March 26, 2014, USA Network aired a live aftershow entitled "Psych After Pshow." The hour-long special was hosted by Kevin Pereira and featured series stars and creator/executive producer Steve Franks.

Release

Syndication
In July 2011, Ion Television announced that Psych would become part of its 2012 broadcast in syndication. During 2012, reruns of the show mostly ran on Saturdays as a marathon. In 2013, Ion Television announced the acquisition option pick-up of season seven of Psych. It no longer airs on Ion Television. The deal with NBC Universal Cable & New Media Distribution adds all 16 new episodes of season seven to Ion's existing library of seasons one–six of Psych and includes rights to future seasons. As of January 2023, Psych started airing on Hallmark Movies and Mysteries.

Home media

Reception

Ratings
Psych scored a 4.51 rating and an average of 6.1 million total viewers at its premiere, which made it the highest-rated scripted series premiere on basic cable in 2006 in all key demographics (households, P18-49, P25-54, and total viewers), according to a USA Network press release, quoted from the Futon Critic.

Notes

Nominations and awards

Psych was the winner of the Independent Investigations Group Annual Award for "Excellence in Entertainment" for advancing the cause of science and exposing superstition. Accepting for Psych was staff writer Daniel Hsia. James Roday Rodriguez was nominated for the 2006 Satellite Award for Best Actor – TV Series Musical or Comedy. Rodriguez was also nominated for the 2009 Ewwy Award for Best Actor in a Comedy. Psych was nominated for its first Emmy Award in 2010 in the category Outstanding Music Composition for a Series for the episode "Mr. Yin Presents...". Adam Cohen and John Robert Wood were the composers for this episode. Psych was nominated for its second Emmy Award in 2012 in the category "Outstanding Creative Achievement in Interactive Media" for their interactive game "HashTag Killer". In 2012 and 2013, Psych was nominated for the People's Choice Award for "Best Cable TV Comedy". In 2014, Psych won the People's Choice Award for "Best Cable TV Comedy" in its last nomination.

Other media

Novels
William Rabkin has written and published five novels based on the series. The novels are written in third-person narrative style. Additionally, Chad Gervich (Small Screen, Big Picture) has published a crime-fighting guide based on methods presented in the show.

Film series

Psych: The Movie

On May 8, 2017, USA Network announced Psych: The Movie, a two-hour TV film to air December 7, 2017. All the original main cast would return for the TV film, which was directed by series creator Steve Franks and written by Franks and series star, James Roday Rodriguez. Zachary Levi was later announced for the film as the main villain, "Thin White Duke", while Jazmyn Simon – Dulé Hill's real-life fiancée – played Selene, a romantic interest for Gus. On July 5, 2017, Charlotte Flair announced that she would be in Psych: The Movie as Heather Rockrear.

On June 28, 2017, former guest star Ralph Macchio joined the cast reprising his role as Nick Conforth, the police academy officer who trained Shawn and Gus in season 5. Principal photography took place from May 25 to June 18 in Vancouver, British Columbia. It was later announced that Timothy Omundson would have a reduced role due to a stroke, but would still appear. In addition, Kurt Fuller, John Cena and Jimmi Simpson were confirmed to be reprising their respective roles of Woody Strode, Ewan O'Hara and Mary Lightly.

Psych 2: Lassie Come Home

On February 14, 2019, it was announced Psych: The Movie 2 was greenlit and all the main cast would return for the TV film, set to premiere in 2019. On April 18, 2019, it was announced Joel McHale would be joining the TV film, as well as Jimmi Simpson, reprising his recurring role as Mary Lightly. On September 17, 2019, it was announced that the sequel had been renamed Psych 2: Lassie Come Home and would instead be airing on NBCUniversal's new streaming service, Peacock. Consequently, the film will only debut after the streaming service is launched. In a November 2019 interview with Larry King, Timothy Omundson revealed that the film would revolve around the characters rallying together in support of Lassie's recovery following a stroke, mirroring Omundson's real-life stroke which led to his reduced presence in Psych: The Movie.

Psych 3: This Is Gus

On May 13, 2021, Peacock announced a third film, Psych 3: This Is Gus, with production set to begin in the summer. On October 9, 2021 at New York Comic Con, it was announced the film will premiere on November 18, 2021. Along with the returning main cast, Kurt Fuller would reprise his role as Woody Strode and Curt Smith returns as himself.

Podcast

The Psychologists Are In: A Psych Rewatch
Launched in November 2021, Maggie Lawson and Timothy Omundson have hosted a weekly rewatch podcast of the series and films. Episodes include plot recaps and behind-the-scenes memories from the two hosts.  The series also features interviews with cast members, guest stars, and crew members, including writers, directors, and series creator Steve Franks.

References

External links

 
 
 Psych on TV Squad

 
2006 American television series debuts
2014 American television series endings
2000s American comedy-drama television series
2010s American comedy-drama television series
2000s American crime drama television series
2010s American crime drama television series
2000s American police comedy television series
2010s American police comedy television series
2000s American police procedural television series
2010s American police procedural television series
American crime comedy television series
English-language television shows
Television series by Universal Television
Television shows set in Santa Barbara, California
Television shows filmed in Vancouver
USA Network original programming
American detective television series
Television series by Universal Content Productions